Garrard is a coal town in Clay County, Kentucky, United States on the junction of United States Highway 421 and Kentucky Highway 80,  south of Manchester.

It was established in 1806 by James Garrard's son Daniel (1780–1866) as a salt works, he having bought the land in 1798, but didn't actually gain the name until the Cumberland and Manchester Railroad came through there in 1917.
It was through the 19th century rather known as variously the Goose Creek Salt Works (after the adjacent Goose Creek), the Union Salt Works, the Buffalo Lick Salt Works, or just The Salt Works.

Its post office was established on 1917-04-28 by postmaster James H. Brashear, and that was named Garrard, likely not after James or Daniel but rather after James' great-grandsons William Toulmin Garrard and Edward Gibson Garrard, who owned the land, although another story is that it was named after James' grandson Theophilus T. Garrard.

Garrard family connections 
Members of the Garrard family born at the salt works include Eliza Ann Garrard (1809, daughter of Daniel), James H. Garrard, Theophilus T. Garrard, Edward Pendleton Garrard (1814), Maria Pacheco Padilla Garrard (1815), Margaret Garrard (1818, daughter of Daniel), Catherine Francis Garrard (1825), Lucinda C. Garrard (1827), Sophia Garrard (1830), and Pauline Mountjoy Garrard (1833).

19th century decline and Civil War destruction 
The salt works were deliberately destroyed by the Union army in the United States Civil War, as a preventative measure after the Confederate side had boasted of their value as a military objective with respect to anything else in the entire state of Kentucky.
A report of the commander of the brigade who re-took Manchester, Charles Craft, explained the need to destroy the works, saying that "every circumstance led to the belief that the quantity [of salt] on hand would have been shortly taken" when his brigade left to fight elsewhere that it was needed, and that "as a matter of economy; the destruction of the works seemed to be a wise movement".

It took 500 soldiers 36 hours, overseen by three colonels of the regiment.
Cannon balls were forced into pipes; pumps removed, broken, and then pushed back into wells; and the salt dumped into rivers.
A few "loyal citizens around and in the neighbourhood", as described in reports, were permitted to take some salt so that they had a supply for themselves.
Theophilus T. Garrard requested compensation after the war from the federal government, but this was denied.
Although rebuilt post-war, the salt works were not the major industry in the region that they had been pre-war, as competition from other saltworks elsewhere and improved transport drive down prices.

The salt industry had been in decline even before the war.
In 1850 they had 11 employees at the salt works and owned 37 slaves; but in 1860 owned 21 slaves.

A continual pre-war problem for salt making at the Salt Works had been that Goose Creek river was only navigable at certain times of year for commercial shipping.
Several largely ineffective steps were taken to improve navigability, with Daniel Garrard along with two others appointed river commissioners in 1810 with powers to unblock the river, and a subscription raising measure approved by the Kentucky General Assembly in 1813.
The most effective measure was Daniel Garrard using 32 of his "hands" (i.e. slaves) to clear the South Fork of the Kentucky River of obstacles in 1818.

Several calls were made by Garrard and others to further improve matters, to legislators that did not heed them, in part because of national economic depression that began in 1838.
A 1835 report by the Kentucky Board of Internal Improvements stated for example:

Railway 
By the middle 20th century, Garrard railroad stop included a water supply tank, owned by the Louisville and Nashville Railroad.

Cross-reference

Sources

 
 

Further reading 

 

Unincorporated communities in Clay County, Kentucky
Unincorporated communities in Kentucky
Coal towns in Kentucky